Tumurun Private Museum is a private museum in Surakarta, Indonesia's Central Java. The Lukimento family, the founders of Sri Rejeki Tekstil Inc., Asia's largest textile manufacturer, commonly known as Sritex Inc., run the museum, which opened in April 2018.

Exhibitions 
The museum houses roughly a hundred works of modern and contemporary art, the most of which are from the Lukminto family's private collection. Basuki Abdullah, Affandi, Hendra Gunawan, Eddie Hara, Rudi Mantofani, Eko Nugroho, Srihadi Soedarsono, and S. Sudjojono are among the artists represented. The museum also has foreign collections from Japan, the Philippines, Singapore, and the United States.

One piece in the collection, "Badman and Superbad" is a 2003 painting by Indonesian artist Heri Dono. The work, measuring 286 x 340 cm, conveys the artist's criticism of the belief that the Iraq war was aimed at controlling the supply of crude oil and other political interests.

Art installations, such as Wedhar Riyadi's Floating Eyes, have also been shown in the museum (2017).

Classic cars from the family's collection were on display.

References

External links
 

Museums in Surakarta